Clark Airport  is a privately owned public airport in Justin, Denton County, Texas, United States, located approximately  south of the central business district. The airport has no IATA or ICAO designation.

The airport is used solely for general aviation purposes.

Facilities 
 Runway 17/35: 1,800 x 22 ft. (549 x 7 m), Surface: Asphalt

For the 12-month period ending December 31, 2015, the airport had 1,000 aircraft operations, an average of 3 per day: 100% general aviation. At that time there were 20 aircraft based at this airport: 100% single-engine, with no multi-engine, jets, helicopters, ultralights, or gliders.

References

External links 
  at Texas DOT Airport Directory

Airports in Texas
Airports in the Dallas–Fort Worth metroplex
Transportation in Denton County, Texas